The 2018–19 Polish Basketball League (PLK) season, the Energa Basket Liga for sponsorship reasons, was the 85th season of the Polish Basketball League, the highest professional basketball league in the Poland. Anwil Włocławek defended its title and repeated as Polish champions.

Teams
Czarni Słupsk withdrew during the 2017–18 PLK season because of financial problems.

On 17 May 2018, Spójnia Stargard promoted to the PLK as the winners of the I Liga, after defeating Sokół Łańcut 3–0 in the playoff finals.

Also, during the pre-season, PGE Turów Zgorzelec withdrew from the tournament.
Locations and venues

Regular season

League table

Results

Playoffs
Quarterfinals and semifinals are played in a best-of-five format (2-2-1) while the finals in a best-of-seven one (2-2-1-1-1).

Bracket

Quarter-finals

|}

Semi-finals

|}

Third place series

|}

Finals

|}

Awards
All official awards of the 2018–19 PLK season.

PLK Most Valuable Player

PLK Best Defender

PLK Best Polish Player

PLK Best Coach

All-PLK Team

Polish clubs in European competitions

Polish clubs in Regional competitions

References

External links
Polska Liga Koszykówki - Official Site 
Polish League at Eurobasket.com

Polish Basketball League seasons
1
Poland